Gafait is a town in Jerada Province, Oriental, Morocco. According to the 2004 census it has a population of 2654.

References

Populated places in Oriental (Morocco)
Jerada Province